Van Oostrum is a Dutch toponymic surname. Among variant forms are (van) Oosterom and (van) Oostrom. The name usually indicates an origin in the former (10th to 18th century) village Oostrum (from Oosterheem, "eastern settlement") near Houten, Utrecht. Some families may be linked to  Oostrum, Friesland or  instead. Notable people with the surname include:

Variants

Van Oostrum 
 Devon van Oostrum (born 1993), British-Dutch basketball player, brother of Nigel
  (born 1982), Dutch basketball player
 Job van Oostrum (born 1954), Dutch bobsledder
 Kees van Oostrum (born 1953), Dutch cinematographer
 Martijn van Oostrum (born 1976), Dutch judoka
 Michel van Oostrum (born 1966), Dutch football striker
 Nigel van Oostrum (born 1990), British-Dutch basketball player, brother of Devon

Van Oosterom / Oosterum 
  (born 1974), Dutch classical pianist
 Robert van Oosterom (born 1968), Dutch cricketer
 Joop van Oosterom (1937–2016), Dutch IT entrepreneur, chess sponsor and player

(Van) Oostrom 
 André Oostrom (born 1953), Dutch football midfielder
 Frits van Oostrom (born 1953), Dutch medievalist and literary historian
 John Oostrom (born 1930), Dutch-born Canadian business executive and parliamentarian
  (born 1942), Dutch saxophonist
  (born 1967), Dutch football player
 Soesoe van Oostrom Soede (1911–1939), Dutch swimmer and water polo player

See also
Simon Jan van Ooststroom (1906–1982), Dutch botanist

References

Dutch-language surnames
Surnames of Dutch origin
Toponymic surnames